Kamen Rider Zi-O is a Japanese tokusatsu drama in Toei Company's Kamen Rider series. It is the twentieth and final series in the Heisei period run and the twenty-ninth series overall. The series tells the story of a young man who, according to visitors from the future, is destined to become a tyrant who will subjugate the entire world, and embarks on a journey across time to change his fate; meeting other Kamen Riders from the past along the way.

Episodes

References

Zi-O
Episodes
Kamen Rider Zi-O